"Computers Don't Argue" is a 1965 science fiction short story by American writer  Gordon R. Dickson, about the dangers of relying too strongly upon computers. It was nominated for a Nebula Award in 1966.

Synopsis
The story is told in the form of correspondence.

Walter A. Child of Panduk, Michigan has a disagreement with his book club in Chicago, Illinois over a damaged copy of Kim  by Rudyard Kipling (cost $4.98) that was sent to him. He returned it, asking for a replacement. Instead, he is sent a copy of Kidnapped by Robert Louis Stevenson. He returns it, requesting that the matter be settled. Instead, he receives a second, automated notice.

He replies saying that the book club now owes him money. He receives a third letter and his reply to it is not read. His account is then turned over to a third party collection agency, increasing the amount owing to $6.83. A second letter ups it to $7.51 and a third to $10.01. Child responds with a letter explaining the matter, but the agency does not believe him and threatens legal action.

The matter goes to small claims court in Illinois, the amount having increased to $15.66. A duplicate judgment is passed the next day in Michigan. However, the amount owing ($15.66) and the statute number (Statute 941) are transposed on the punch card.

Child sends a letter that he will visit the book club offices personally and settle the matter himself. Meanwhile the transposed amount is interpreted as Statute 1566, relating to criminal matters. Since no such statute exists, it is changed to 1567 (Kidnapping). The changed punch card is then incorrectly interpreted to relate to the kidnapping of a child named Robert Louis Stevenson by a person named A. Walter and an arrest and hold warrant is issued.

Child is arrested at the book club offices. The judge requests more information, since a trial transcript is missing from the record. He specifically requests if the victim, Robert Louis Stevenson, was harmed. The request returns that RLS is deceased, having died at age 44. The reply omits the age of death, simply replying that the victim is dead. A personal reply to the judge mentions that the victim was slain and mentions a possible gang connection.

Child's lawyer believes him, but Child is sentenced to execution, for first-degree murder in connection with the death of a kidnap victim. Since no previous trial transcripts were available, the judge was forced to rely on the computerized records.

Since all records have been computerized, appeal time has been cut to 5 days, and 10 for it to be acted upon. Instead of appealing, he appeals to the governor for a pardon. The governor is out of the country and slow in responding. Child refuses an offer by the warden to let him escape, believing that the pardon will arrive in time.

The pardon is issued by the governor, but a post office routing number error stalls it and it arrives too late.

Adaptations
The story was read on Mindwebs in 1978.

Translations
 In 1966, it was published in French as "Les ordinateurs ne discutent pas".
 In 1969, it was published in Dutch as "Met computers valt niet te praten".
 In 1970, it was published in German as "Computer streiten nicht".
 In 1973, it was published in Hungarian as "A komputer nem tűr ellentmondást".
 In 1981, it was published in Croatian as "Kompjuteri ne raspravljaju".
 In 1987, it was published in French as "On ne discute pas avec les ordinateurs".
 In 1996, it was published in Urania Magazine as "I computer non discutono", translated by Elisabetta Moreolo Svaluto.

See also 
Garbage in, garbage out

References

External links 
 

1965 short stories
Short stories by Gordon R. Dickson
Works originally published in Analog Science Fiction and Fact
Speculative fiction short stories
1960s science fiction works